The Young Republican National Federation, commonly referred to as the Young Republicans or YRNF, is a 527 organization for members of the Republican Party of the United States between the ages of 18 and 40. It has both a national organization and chapters in individual states.

Although frequently confused, the YRNF is separate from the College Republicans.

Young Republican Clubs are both social and political in nature. Many of them sponsor various social events and networking events for members. In addition, Young Republican Clubs assist Republican political candidates and causes.

History 
Although Young Republican organizations existed as early as 1856 with the founding of the New York Young Republican Club, the Young Republican National Federation was formed by George H. Olmsted at the urging of Herbert Hoover. The YRNF was officially founded in 1931.

See also 
 College Republicans
 Teen Age Republicans
 Republican Party (United States)
 Republicans Overseas
 Young Democrats of America
 The New York Young Republican Club

Footnotes

Further reading 

 Jon Grinspan, "'Young Men for War': The Wide Awakes and Lincoln's 1860 Presidential Campaign," Journal of American History, vol. 96, no. 2, (Sept. 2009), pp. 357–378. In JSTOR
Each state can start their own Young Republican Federation.  Additional reading for each state can be found on each states 'About Me' section. www.Iowayr.com/about

External links 
 

Youth wings of political parties in the United States
Republican Party (United States) organizations
International Young Democrat Union
Youth wings of conservative parties
Political organizations established in 1931
Young Republican National Federation